Rickettsia africae is a species of Rickettsia.

It can cause African tick-bite fever.

References

Rickettsiaceae